Sabrina Aparecida Galdino Martins (born 11 February 2003), commonly known as Sassá, is a Brazilian footballer who plays as a central defender for Palmeiras.

Club career
Born in São Paulo, Sassá joined Santos' youth setup in 2018 through a social project. Promoted to the main squad in September 2020, she made his senior debut on 11 October of that year, starting in a 1–0 Campeonato Brasileiro Série A1 home win over Vitória.

On 23 January 2021, Sassá signed her first professional contract with Santos. On 28 December 2022, she left the club after her contract was due to expire.

On 19 January 2023, Sassá was announced at Palmeiras.

Honours
Santos
: 2020

References

2003 births
Living people
Footballers from São Paulo
Brazilian women's footballers
Women's association football defenders
Campeonato Brasileiro de Futebol Feminino Série A1 players
Santos FC (women) players
Sociedade Esportiva Palmeiras (women) players